The Borneo black-banded squirrel (Callosciurus orestes) is a species of rodent in the family Sciuridae. It is endemic to northern Borneo.

Distribution
This species is found in northern Borneo at middle elevations (Payne et al. 1985). It was known from G. Dulit (above ) and reported from similar altitude on Usun Apau, the Kelabit Highlands and the upper S. Terusan, all montane localities in northern Sarawak. It was also known from Mount Kinabalu and Mount Trusmadi (about ) in Sabah. It appears to be restricted to lower montane forest and to upper dipterocarp forest.

Behaviour and ecology
The upper part is finely speckled brown. A pale buffy spot behind each ears. The underside is grey, sometimes with a reddish tinge. It also has a black and buffy-white side stripe. Callosciurus orestes is diurnal. They are active in small to medium-sized trees. Recently, fruit and black ants were found out in the two species of Mount Kinabalu.

Conservation status
Based on The IUCN Red List Threatened Species, Callosciurus orestes is of Least Concern. It is listed as Least Concern as it is a middle montane species with a wide range. Some forest loss is occurring but not enough to list as Near Threatened.

References

Thorington, R. W. Jr. and R. S. Hoffman. 2005. Family Sciuridae. pp. 754–818 in Mammal Species of the World a Taxonomic and Geographic Reference. D. E. Wilson and D. M. Reeder eds. Johns Hopkins University Press, Baltimore.
Payne, J., C. M. Francis, and K. Phillipps 1985. A field guide to the mammals of Borneo. Kota Kinabalu: The Sabah Society

Callosciurus
Endemic fauna of Borneo
Rodents of Indonesia
Rodents of Malaysia
Mammals of Borneo
Mammals described in 1895
Taxa named by Oldfield Thomas
Taxonomy articles created by Polbot
Fauna of the Borneo montane rain forests